Célia Serber (born 13 August 2003) is a French artistic gymnast and a member of the French national team. She is the 2017 and 2018 junior national champion in the all-around. She represented France at the 2017 European Youth Olympic Festival and won the bronze medal on floor. She made her senior debut at the 2019 American Cup, where she finished eighth. She was the alternate for the French team at the 2019 World Championships. In June 2021, she was selected as an alternate to the French team for the 2020 Summer Olympics.

Competitive history

References

External links
 

2003 births
Living people
French female artistic gymnasts
Sportspeople from Dijon
Mediterranean Games silver medalists for France
Mediterranean Games medalists in gymnastics
Gymnasts at the 2022 Mediterranean Games
21st-century French women